Gartmore railway station served the village of Gartmore, in the historical county of Stirlingshire, Scotland, from 1882 to 1950 on the Strathendrick and Aberfoyle Railway.

History 
The station was opened on 2 October 1882 by the North British Railway. It served the nearby Gartmore House. On the west side was a loading bank and the signal box. The station closed on 2 January 1950.

References 

Disused railway stations in Stirling (council area)
Former North British Railway stations
Railway stations in Great Britain opened in 1882
Railway stations in Great Britain closed in 1950
1882 establishments in Scotland
1950 disestablishments in Scotland